Heisenberg's microscope is a thought experiment proposed by Werner Heisenberg that has served as the nucleus of some commonly held ideas about quantum mechanics. In particular, it provides an argument for the uncertainty principle on the basis of the principles of classical optics. 

The concept was criticized by Heisenberg's mentor Niels Bohr, and theoretical and experimental developments have suggested that Heisenberg's intuitive explanation of his mathematical result might be misleading. While the act of measurement does lead to uncertainty, the loss of precision is less than that predicted by Heisenberg's argument when measured at the level of an individual state. The formal mathematical result remains valid, however, and the original intuitive argument has also been vindicated mathematically when the notion of disturbance is expanded to be independent of any specific state.

Heisenberg's argument

Heisenberg supposes that an electron is like a classical particle, moving in the  direction along a line below the microscope. Let the cone of light rays leaving the microscope lens and focusing on the electron make an angle   with the electron. Let  be the wavelength of the light rays. Then, according to the laws of classical optics, the microscope can only resolve the position of the electron up to an accuracy of

An observer perceives an image of the particle because the light rays strike the particle and bounce back through the microscope to the observer's eye. However, the extent of "recoil cannot be exactly known, since the direction of the scattered photon is undetermined within the bundle of rays entering the microscope." In particular, the electron's momentum in the  direction is only determined up to

,

which is an approximate expression of Heisenberg's uncertainty principle.

Analysis of argument

Although the thought experiment was formulated as an introduction to Heisenberg's uncertainty principle, one of the pillars of modern physics, it attacks the very premises under which it was constructed, thereby contributing to the development of an area of physics—namely, quantum mechanics—that redefined the terms under which the original thought experiment was conceived. 

Quantum mechanics questions whether an electron actually has a determinate position before it is disturbed by the measurement used to establish said determinate position. Under a more thorough quantum mechanical analysis, an electron has some probability of showing up at any point in the universe, though the probability that it will be far from where one  expects becomes very low at great distances from the neighborhood in which it is originally found. In other words, the "position" of an electron can only be stated in terms of a probability distribution, as can predictions of where it may move.

See also
 Atom localization
 Quantum mechanics
 Basics of quantum mechanics
 Interpretation of quantum mechanics
 Philosophical interpretation of classical physics
 Schrödinger's cat
 Uncertainty principle
 Quantum field theory
 Electromagnetic radiation

References

Sources

External links
History of Heisenberg's Microscope 
Lectures on Heisenberg's Microscope

Thought experiments in quantum mechanics
Werner Heisenberg